

Medieval Times

Ghana Empire
647 — 709 Muslim conquest of the Maghreb
739 — 743 Berber Revolt
c. 970 — c. 1240 Decline of the Ghana Empire
c. 1075 Almoravid conquest of the Ghana Empire

Mali Empire

1235 — 1230 Pre-imperial expansion
1235 — 1250 Early imperial expansion of the Mali Empire
1300 — 1337 The empire at its zenith
1337 — 1440 The fragmenting empire
1440 — 1490 The empire on the defensive
1500 — 1600 Collapse of the Mali empire

Songhai Empire

1440 — 1490 The Mali Empire on the Defensive
1500 — 1600 Collapse of the Mali Empire
1578 — 1603  Campaigns of Ahmad al-Mansur of the Saadi dynasty of Morocco

Modern Times

Islamic Republic of Mauritania
February 25, 2011 — 2012? Mauritanian protests

See also
List of wars involving Mauritania
Military of Mauritania
Military history of Africa
African military systems to 1800
African military systems (1800–1900)
African military systems after 1900

Military history of Mauritania
Conflicts
Events